The Moldovan Constitution of 1994 is the supreme law of the country, since 27 August 1994.

History 

The current Constitution of Moldova was adopted on 29 July 1994 by the Moldovan Parliament and published in the Moldovan official gazette on 12 August 1994. It came into force on 27 August 1994, abrogating the previous Constitution of 1978 in its entirety.

Since 1994, the Constitution has been successfully amended eight times. There have also been unsuccessful attempts to amend it, such as the 2010 constitutional referendum.

The Titles And Chapters 
 Title I - General Principles
 Title II - Fundamental Rights, Freedoms And Duties
 Chapter I - General Provisions
 Chapter II - Fundamental Rights And Freedoms
 Chapter III - Fundamental Duties
 Title III - Public Authorities
 Chapter IV - Parliament 
 First Section - Structure And Functioning
 Second Section - The Status Of Parliament Members
 Third Section - Legislation And Acts Of Parliament
 Chapter V - the President Of The Republic Of Moldova 
 Chapter VI - the Government 
 Chapter VII - The parliament - the Government Interrelationship 
 Chapter VIII - Public Administration
 Chapter IX - Judicial Authority
 First Section - Courts Of Law
 Second Section - The Higher Magistrates' Council
 Third Section - The Public Prosecution Office
 Title IV - National Economy And Public Finance
 Title V - Constitutional Court
 Title VI - Revising The Constitution
 Title VII - Final And Transitory Provisions

See also  
 Moldovan constitutional referendum, 2010
 Commission for constitutional reform in Moldova
 Constitution of Moldova (1978) 
 Constitution of Moldova (1941)

External links
  Text of the Constitution of Moldova
  English translation of the Constitution of Moldova

 

Moldova
1994 in Moldova
1994 in law
1994 documents